Oishii is an American vertical farming company that grows strawberries. Founded in 2016 by Hiroki Koga and Brendan Somerville, Oishii produces the "omakase" berry, which launched in 2018 at grocers in New York City. Originally selling for $50 per a tray of eight strawberries, the company cut prices to $20 per tray in 2022. Oishii opened a 74,000 square-foot vertical farm in Jersey City, New Jersey in 2022.

References 

Farms in New Jersey
Kearny, New Jersey
American companies established in 2016
Experimental farms in the United States
Agriculture companies established in 2016